Erotomania, also known as de Clérambault's Syndrome, named after French psychiatrist Gaëtan Gatian de Clérambault, is listed in the DSM-5 as a subtype of a delusional disorder. It is a relatively uncommon paranoid condition that is characterized by an individual's delusions of another person being infatuated with them. This disorder is most often seen (though not exclusively) in female patients who are shy, dependent, and sexually inexperienced. The object of the delusion is typically a male who is unattainable due to high social or financial status, marriage, or lack of interest. The object of obsession may also be imaginary, deceased, or someone the patient has never met. Delusions of reference are common, as the erotomanic individual often perceives that they are being sent messages from the secret admirer through innocuous events such as seeing license plates from specific states, but has no proof. Commonly, the onset of erotomania is sudden, and the course is chronic.

Presentation
Erotomania is more common in women, but men are more likely to exhibit violent and stalker-like behaviors. The core symptom of the disorder is that the individual holds an unshakable belief that another person is secretly in love with them. In some cases, the person with the condition may believe several people at once are "secret admirers". Most commonly, the individual has delusions of being loved by an unattainable person who is usually an acquaintance or someone the person has never met. They may also experience other types of delusions concurrently with erotomania, such as delusions of reference, wherein the perceived admirer secretly communicates their love by subtle methods such as body posture, arrangement of household objects, colors, license plates on cars from specific states, and other seemingly innocuous acts (or, if the person is a public figure, through clues in the media). Some delusions may be extreme such as the conception, birth, and kidnapping of children that never existed. The delusional objects may be replaced by others over time, and some may be chronic in fixed forms. Denial is characteristic with this disorder as the patients do not accept the fact that their object of delusion may be married, unavailable, or uninterested. The phantom lover may also be imaginary or deceased.

Erotomania has two forms: primary and secondary. Primary erotomania is also commonly referred to as de Clerambault's syndrome and Old Maid's Insanity and it exists alone without comorbidities, has a sudden onset and a chronic outcome. The secondary form is found along with mental disorders like paranoid schizophrenia, often includes persecutory delusions, hallucinations, and grandiose ideas, and has a more gradual onset. Patients with a "fixed" condition are more seriously ill with constant delusions and are less responsive to treatment. These individuals are usually timid, dependent women that are often sexually inexperienced. In those with a more mild, recurrent condition, delusions are shorter-lived and the disorder can exist undetected by others for years. Problematic behaviors include actions like calling, sending letters and gifts, making unannounced house visits and other persistent stalking behaviors.

Cause
Erotomania may present as a primary mental disorder, or as a symptom of another psychiatric illness. With secondary erotomania, the erotomanic delusions are due to other mental disorders such as bipolar I disorder or schizophrenia. Symptoms may also be precipitated by alcoholism and the use of antidepressants. There may be a potential genetic component involved as family histories of first degree relatives with histories of psychiatric disorders are common. Sigmund Freud explained erotomania as a defense mechanism to ward off homosexual impulses which can lead to strong feelings of paranoia, denial, displacement and projection. Similarly, it has been explained as a way to cope with severe loneliness or ego deficit following a major loss. Erotomania may also be linked to unsatiated urges dealing with homosexuality or narcissism. Some research shows brain abnormalities occurring in patients with erotomania such as heightened temporal lobe asymmetry and greater volumes of lateral ventricles than those with no mental disorders.

Treatment
Prognosis differs from person to person, and the ideal treatment is not completely understood. Treatment for this disorder gains the best results when tailored specifically for each individual. To date, the mainline pharmacological treatments have been pimozide (a typical antipsychotic which was also approved for treating Tourette's Syndrome), and atypical antipsychotics like risperidone and clozapine. Non-pharmacologic treatments that have shown some degree of efficacy are electroconvulsive therapy (ECT), supportive psychotherapy, family and environment therapy, rehousing, risk management and treating underlying disorders in cases of secondary erotomania. ECT may provide temporary remission of delusional beliefs; antipsychotics help attenuate delusions and reduce agitation or associated dangerous behaviors, and SSRIs may be used to treat secondary depression. In delusional disorder there is some evidence that pimozide has superior efficacy compared with other antipsychotics. Psychosocial psychiatric interventions can enhance the quality of life through allowing some social functioning, and treating comorbid disorders is a priority for secondary erotomania. Family therapy, adjustment of socio-environmental factors, and replacing delusions with something positive may be beneficial to all. In most cases, harsh confrontation should be avoided. Structured risk assessment helps to manage risky behaviors in those individuals more likely to engage in actions that include violence, stalking, and crime. For particularly troublesome cases, neuroleptics and enforced separation may be moderately effective.

History

Early references to the condition can be found in the work of Hippocrates, Freud (1911), G.G. de Clérambault (1942), Erasistratus, Plutarch and Galen. Parisian physician, Bartholomy Pardoux (1545-1611) covered the topics of nymphomania and erotomania. In 1623, erotomania was referred to in a treatise by Jacques Ferrand (Maladie d'amour ou Mélancolie érotique) and has been called "erotic paranoia" and "erotic self-referent delusion" until the common usage of the terms erotomania and de Clérambault's syndrome. In 1971 and 1977, M.V. Seeman referred to the disorder as "phantom lover syndrome" and "psychotic erotic transference reaction and delusional loving". Emil Kraepelin and Bernard also wrote of erotomania and more recently, Winokur, Kendler, and Munro have contributed to knowledge on the disorder.

G. E. Berrios and N. Kennedy outlined in 'Erotomania: a conceptual history' (2002) several periods of history through which the definition of erotomania has changed considerably:
Classical times – early eighteenth century: General disease caused by unrequited love
Early eighteenth-beginning of nineteenth century: Practise of excess physical love (akin to nymphomania or satyriasis)
Early nineteenth century – beginning twentieth century: Unrequited love as a form of mental disease
Early twentieth century – present: Delusional belief of "being loved by someone else"

In one case, erotomania was reported in a patient who had undergone surgery for a ruptured cerebral aneurysm.

Well-known cases
In his paper that described the syndrome, de Clérambault referenced a patient he had counselled who was obsessed with British monarch George V. She had stood outside Buckingham Palace for hours at a time, believing that the king was communicating his desire for her by moving the curtains.

Parallels were drawn between this and a 2011 case where the body of a homeless American man was found on a secluded island in St James Park, within sight of Buckingham Palace. The man had sent hundreds of "strange and offensive" packages to Queen Elizabeth II over the previous fifteen years.

The attempted assassination of United States president Ronald Reagan by John Hinckley Jr. has been reported to have been driven by an erotomaniac fixation on actress Jodie Foster, whom Hinckley was attempting to impress.

Late-night TV entertainer David Letterman and former astronaut Story Musgrave were both stalked by Margaret Mary Ray, who had erotomania.

Michael David Barrett allegedly had erotomania, stalking ESPN correspondent Erin Andrews across the country, trying to see her and taking lewd videos.

Many cases of obsession or stalking can be linked to erotomania but do not always necessarily go hand in hand.

In media 
 Girls Town (1959)
 Nurse Betty (2000)
 A main character in the American TV series Orange Is the New Black, Lorna Morello, exhibits erotomanic behavior towards a man to whom she deludedly believes herself to be engaged
 He Loves Me... He Loves Me Not (2002)
 A 2011 episode (Series 5, Episode 3) of the British TV series Lewis features a character with erotomania, referred to in the show as de Clérambault's syndrome
 Enduring Love (1997)
 Criminal Minds Season 1, Episode 5: "Broken Mirror"
 Doc Martin Season 6, Episode 3: The Tameness of a Wolf
 Law & Order Season 3, Episode 18: “Animal Instinct”
 A 2019 episode (Series 1, Episode 2) of the British-Austrian series Vienna Blood features a character who displays symptoms of de Clérambault's syndrome (although correctly not described as such, since the programme is set in 1907, 14 years before de Clérambault himself described the syndrome)
You (TV series)  Season 4, Episode 6 & 8

See also

Further reading
 
 
 Frank Bruni, Behind the Jokes, a Life Of Pain and Delusion; For Letterman Stalker, Mental Illness Was Family Curse and Scarring Legacy, New York Times, November 22, 1998
 Foster, David & Levinson, Arlene. Suicide on a railroad track ends a celebrity-stalker's inner agony Archived 2011-06-14 at the Wayback Machine., Associated Press, October 11, 1998
 
 Helen K. Gediman (14 December 2016). Stalker, Hacker, Voyeur, Spy: A Psychoanalytic Study of Erotomania, Voyeurism, Surveillance, and Invasions of Privacy. Karnac Books. pp. 21–34. .

References

Notes

Bibliography

Helen K. Gediman (14 December 2016). Stalker, Hacker, Voyeur, Spy: A Psychoanalytic Study of Erotomania, Voyeurism, Surveillance, and Invasions of Privacy. Karnac Books. pp. 21–34. .
 
 
McDonnell, Margaux, and Mike McPadden. "9 Stalkers That Make Us Glad We're Not Famous." CrimeFeed, 12 Nov. 2013, crimefeed.com/2013/10/9-stalkers-that-make-us-glad-were-not-famous/.
 
 
 

Psychosis
Delusional disorders
Love
Stalking
Psychopathological syndromes
Delusions